Katsusuke (written: 勝弼, 勝資 or 勝典) is a masculine Japanese given name. Notable people with the name include:

 (1529–1582), Japanese samurai
, Japanese daimyō
 (born 1944), Japanese writer and activist

Japanese masculine given names